The Saint John the Baptist Church is a Roman Catholic church in Podhum, Livno, Bosnia and Herzegovina.

References 

Roman Catholic churches in Livno
Livno
Roman Catholic churches completed in 1975
20th-century Roman Catholic church buildings in Bosnia and Herzegovina